EGT may refer to:

Organisations 
 Lutheran Gymnasium Tisovec, a school in Slovakia
 Emergent Game Technologies, developer of the Gamebryo video game engine

Science and technology 
 Evolutionary game theory
 Evolutionary Governance Theory
 Exhaust gas temperature

Sport 
 FIA Electric GT Championship, a planned electric race car competition

Transport 
 Eaglemont railway station, Victoria, Australia
 Egton railway station, England
 Wellington Municipal Airport, Kansas, United States